Fabien Mercadal (born 29 February 1972) is a French professional football manager and former player who played as a defender.

Playing career
The son of a Corsican-born Division 3 footballer, Mercadal had an unassuming career as a footballer in the 3rd and 4th divisions in France. Mercadal was considered an unlucky footballer who was set back by a couple severe injuries.

Managerial career
Mercadal begun coaching professionally with Tours FC in the French Ligue 2 in 2016. After a series of unfortunate results he was let go, and spent 4 months waiting for his next opportunity. He joined Paris FC in the summer of 2017. Mercadal is a passionate coach, known for his extravagant praise. A self-admitted sore loser, Mercadal vomited after losses early in his career.

On 8 June 2018, Mercadal was announced as the manager of Ligue 1 side Stade Malherbe Caen.

On 25 May 2019, Mercadal was left the club by mutual consent, following the 0–1 defeat against Bordeaux and the relegation to Ligue 2. During 38 Ligue 1 games as the head coach of Stade Malherbe, Mercadal had 7 victories, 12 draws and 19 losses. At the end of the season Stade Malherbe had 33 points which was the lowest number of points the club ever had in Ligue 1.

After being sacked by Stade Malherbe de Caen, Mercadal becomes the head coach of Cercle Bruge. However he is once again sacked after losing 10 games out of 11, leaving the team at the bottom of the league.

On 16 May 2020, Mercadal was appointed as manager of USL Dunkerque, newly promoted to Ligue 2. He left the club in May 2021.

On 4 January 2022, Mercadal became new manager of Ligue 2 club Quevilly-Rouen.

Managerial statistics

References

External links 
Paris FC Profile

1972 births
Living people
People from Manosque
French footballers
French football managers
French people of Corsican descent
Association football defenders
Championnat National players
Gap HAFC players
Ligue 1 managers
Ligue 2 managers
Stade Malherbe Caen managers
Paris FC managers
Tours FC managers
Cercle Brugge K.S.V. managers
Sportspeople from Alpes-de-Haute-Provence
USL Dunkerque managers
US Quevilly-Rouen Métropole managers
Footballers from Provence-Alpes-Côte d'Azur